Yogesh Tiwari (born 8 November 1997) is an Indian cricketer. He made his Twenty20 debut on 11 January 2021, for Meghalaya in the 2020–21 Syed Mushtaq Ali Trophy. He made his List A debut on 21 February 2021, for Meghalaya in the 2020–21 Vijay Hazare Trophy.

References

External links
 

1997 births
Living people
Indian cricketers
Meghalaya cricketers
Place of birth missing (living people)